William Engseth (born 1 August 1933 in Målselv) is a Norwegian politician for the Labour Party. He was appointed Minister of Local Government Affairs in 1987, and in 1988 he became Minister of Transport and Communications 1988–1989. In 1989 he was elected as a member of the Norwegian Parliament from Troms and held the seat to 1997.

From 1990 to 1994 he was president of the Norwegian Olympic and Paralympic Committee and Confederation of Sports.

References

1933 births
Living people
People from Målselv
Labour Party (Norway) politicians
Ministers of Local Government and Modernisation of Norway
Members of the Storting
Ministers of Transport and Communications of Norway
20th-century Norwegian politicians